The Abuja National Mosque, also known as the Nigerian National Mosque, is the national mosque of Nigeria. The mosque was built in 1984 and is open to the non-Muslim public, except during congregational prayers.

Board and management
After the demise of the chief imam, Sheikh Musa Muhammad, in 2015, the position of a chief imam was abolished. 

On 9 October 2017, with approval of the Nigerian Supreme Council for Islamic Affairs, the Abuja National Mosque Management Board under the chairmanship of Yahaya Abubakar was also dissolved and in its stead a sole administrator, to be addressed as the murshid of the National Mosque, was appointed in the person of Shehu Ahmad Said Galadanci as well as three imams who were hitherto addressed as deputy chief imams were appointed as coequal imams of National Mosque to assist the murshid. They are Ibrahim Ahmad Maqari, Sheikh Ahmad Onilewura and Muhammad Kabir Adam. The murshid assumed duty on 15th November, 2017, combining the post of chief imam and administrative head of the National Mosque. 

Galadanci doubles as the murshid (grand instructor, spiritual guide or general administrator).
Formally, the board of the management is headed by Ibrahim Dasuki, the 18th sultan of Sokoto and president-general of the Nigerian Supreme Council for Islamic Affairs in April 1992 but presently, the management board is under the chairmanship of Yahaya Abubakar.

Aims Construction Limited was awarded the project of building the mosque and they completed the project in 1985.

Location and layout
The mosque is located in the capital city, Abuja, and is situated on Independence Avenue, across from the National Christian Centre. It includes a library and a conference room.

The complex includes a conference centre capable of serving five hundred persons, the office for the Islamic Centre, and residential facilities for the imam and muezzin.  During construction, the general contractors were Lodigiani Nigeria Ltd., while design consultancy was provided by AIM Consultants Ltd.

Gallery

See also
 List of mosques in Africa
 Islam in Nigeria
 List of mosques

References

External links

Photographs of President Yar'Adua attending prayer at the mosque

Mosques in Nigeria
Buildings and structures in Abuja
Mosques completed in 1984
1984 in Nigeria
20th-century religious buildings and structures in Nigeria